Bend is an unincorporated community in Meade County, in the U.S. state of South Dakota.

History
A post office called Bend was established in 1886, and remained in operation until 1941. Bend was named for its location where the Elk Creek meanders.

References

Unincorporated communities in Meade County, South Dakota
Unincorporated communities in South Dakota